The Walloon SME finance and guarantee company (French: Société Wallonne de Financement et de Garantie des Petites et Moyennes Entreprises or SOWALFIN) was founded by the Walloon Region in 2002 to provide capital to the Walloon Small and medium enterprises (SMEs). The purpose of the SOWALFIN is to invest in the equity of unlisted companies (private equity). The SRIW acts either by purchasing shares of SMEs, by increasing the capital of the business, by subscribing to a bond issue, or by granting subordinated or convertible loans.

See also
 Economy of Belgium
 Walloon Export and Foreign Investment Agency (AWEX)
 Regional Investment Company of Wallonia
 Brussels Regional Investment Company
 Sillon industriel

References

 Facts from Belgium

External links
 SOWALFIN
 Invest in Wallonia

Government agencies of Belgium
Companies based in Liège Province
Wallonia